St. Mary's Medical Center may refer to:

 St. Mary's Medical Center (San Francisco), San Francisco, California
 St. Mary's Medical Center (West Palm Beach), West Palm Beach, Florida
 St. Mary's Medical Center (Blue Springs), Blue Springs, Missouri
 St. Mary's Medical Center (Knoxville), Knoxville, Tennessee
 St. Mary's Medical Center (Huntington), Huntington, West Virginia
 St. Mary's of Michigan Medical Center, Saginaw, Michigan
 St. Mary's Hospital Medical Center, Green Bay, Wisconsin
 St. Mary's Hospital and Medical Center, Evansville, Indiana
 St. Mary's Medical Center (Duluth), Duluth, Minnesota
 St. Mary's Medical Center (Clearwater, Florida), Clearwater, Florida
 St. Mary's Medical Center (Grand Junction, Colorado)

See also
St. Mary Medical Center (disambiguation)
St. Mary's Hospital (disambiguation)
St. Mary's Regional Medical Center (disambiguation)

Trauma centers